Sierzchowy  is a village in the administrative district of Gmina Cielądz, within Rawa County, Łódź Voivodeship, in central Poland.

Notable people
Tomasz Arciszewski (1877-1955) - Polish socialist politician, a member of the Polish Socialist Party and the Prime Minister of the Polish government-in-exile was born in Sierzchowy.

References

Sierzchowy